"Unkind" is a song by Canadian rock group Sloan. The song was released as the first single from the band's tenth studio album, The Double Cross.

Music video
The music video for "Unkind" was filmed by Kevin Hilliard & Tim McCready and premiered on Vevo on July 5, 2011. The song was received favorably by Rolling Stone, who described the video as "elegant and classy".

Charts

References

2011 singles
Sloan (band) songs
2011 songs
Songs written by Patrick Pentland